"Criminal" is a song recorded by South Korean singer Taemin. It was released as the lead single of his third studio album, Never Gonna Dance Again, on September 7, 2020, through SM Entertainment. A synthwave song with Stockholm syndrome-themed lyrics, "Criminal" was written by Danke, Lauren Aquilina, Chloe Latimer, Shae Jacobs, Score and Megatone, and produced by Jacobs, Score and Megatone.

Background and release
On August 28, 2020, SM Entertainment announced that Taemin would be releasing the first part of his third studio album, Never Gonna Dance Again: Act 1, on September 7, alongside the lead single "Criminal". It was released in the same timeframe as the SuperM album Super One, causing Taemin to split his time between the two projects. Two remixes of the song by DJ Minit and Sumin were released on September 29 as part of SM's iScreaM project.

Composition
"Criminal" is a synthwave song with "newtro" (new retro) sounds and a Stockholm syndrome theme. Taemin described the song as having "a dark, internal feeling". It features narration from news broadcasts in the bridge, an idea that was introduced by Taemin. The song "pulsates with an intoxicating, borderline hypnotic groove", before building to "an explosive moment of catharsis" in the final chorus. The lyrics depict being trapped in a toxic relationship in which Taemin is a victim and yet also complicit. Billboard viewed the song as a continuation of themes previously explored in "Move" (2017) and "Want" (2019). They interpreted it as Taemin embracing the darkness of his alter ego, akin to Dr. Jekyll and Mr. Hyde.

Critical reception
"Criminal" received positive reviews from critics, with many labelling it one of the best K-pop songs of the year. Taylor Glasby of Dazed described it as an "opulent piece of sonic cinema".  Crystal Bell of Paper praised Taemin's versatility and artistry, calling him "a master of movement and sensuality". BuzzFeed reporter Emlyn Travis stated, "No one in K-pop is doing it like Taemin". She ranked "Criminal" first in her list of the best K-pop songs of the year. Writing for IZE, Kim Yun-ha praised the explosive energy of the song, highlighting the intensity of the final chorus. According to Marga Buenaventura of CNN Philippines Life, the song "reinforces the idea that among male idols today, Taemin is indeed an ace among aces".

Year-end lists

Accolades

Music video
The music video for "Criminal" was directed by Jo Beom-jin of VM Project Architecture, who had previously worked with Taemin on "Press Your Number" (2016) and "Drip Drop" (2016). Jo was handpicked by Taemin and they developed the music video together. In the video, Taemin performs the choreography to the song on various sets, including a lava floor, a "sterile white room" and a setpiece inspired by The Devil's Advocate. The choreography was created by Kasper and Koharu Sugawara. Taemin had collaborated with Sugawara on several of his previous releases, including "Move" and "Want". He begins the choreography with his hands tied, an idea that was included at Taemin's suggestion, and unties the knot with his teeth as the chorus begins. At the song's climax, Taemin utters the line, "Destroy me more," while staring directly at the camera and running a hand through his hair. Following this, the dancers, clothed in red, explode in movement around him, introducing "an element of catharsis". Tassia Assis of Teen Vogue described this as "a surrender to the dark, twisty maze of his own artistry." Billboard praised his use of "visual imagery as an extension" of the music.

Credits and personnel
Credits adapted from the liner notes of Never Gonna Dance Again: Act 1.

Recording
 Recorded at SM Lvyin Studio
 Digitally edited and engineered for mix at SM Big Shot Studio
 Mixed at SM Blue Ocean Studio
 Mastered at 821 Sound Mastering

Personnel
 Taemin – vocals, background vocals
 Danke (LaLaLa Studio) – lyrics
 Lauren Aquilina – composition
 Chloe Latimer – composition
 Shae Jacobs – composition, arrangement
 Score (13) – arrangement, composition, drums, piano
 Megatone (13) – composition, arrangement
 Deez – vocal directing
 Onestar – background vocals
 Kim Byeong-seok – bass, guitar
 Lee Ji-hong – recording
 Lee Min-gyu – digital editing, engineering for mix
 Kim Cheol-sun – mixing
 Kwon Nam-woo – mastering

Charts

Release history

References

2020 singles
2020 songs
Taemin songs
SM Entertainment singles
Korean-language songs
Synthwave songs
Songs written by Lauren Aquilina